This is a list of the main career statistics of American professional tennis player, Madison Keys. To date, Keys has won five WTA singles titles, including one Premier 5, four Premier, and reached four more finals. Having first cracked the top 100 after reaching the third round at the 2013 Australian Open, Keys introduced herself to the wider public when she reached the Australian Open semifinals in 2015 as a teenager, losing to the World No. 1 and eventual champion Serena Williams. She cracked the top 20 for the first time following the tournament. On June 20, 2016, Keys achieved a top 10 ranking for the first time in her career, which she secured by reaching the Birmingham final. In September 2017, Keys reached her first Grand Slam final at the 2017 US Open.

Performance timelines

Only main-draw results in WTA Tour, Grand Slam tournaments, Fed Cup/Billie Jean King Cup and Olympic Games are included in win–loss records.

Singles
Current after the 2023 Dubai Open.

Doubles
Current through the 2023 Australian Open

Grand Slam tournament finals

Singles: 1 (1 runner-up)

Other significant finals

Premier Mandatory & Premier 5 finals

Singles: 3 (1 title, 2 runner-ups)

Olympic Games medal matches

Singles: 1

WTA career finals

Singles: 11 (6 titles, 5 runner-ups)

Fed Cup/Billie Jean King Cup participation
Current through the 2020 Fed Cup Qualifying Round.

Singles (4–4)

Doubles (1–1)

ITF Circuit finals

Singles: 4 (3 titles, 1 runner-up)

Doubles: 1 (1 title)

WTA Tour career earnings
Current through the 2022 Guadalajara Open.

Career Grand Slam statistics

Career Grand Slam seedings 
The tournaments won by Keys are in boldface, and advanced into finals by Keys are in italics.

Best Grand Slam results details 
Grand Slam winners are in boldface, and runner–ups are in italics.

Longest winning streaks

10-match winning streak (2022)

Record against other players

Record against top 10 players
Keys's record against players who have been ranked in the top 10. Active players are in boldface.

No. 1 wins

Top 10 wins

Notes

References

Keys, Madison